Laubellidae is an extinct family of sea snails, marine gastropod mollusks in the clade Vetigastropoda (according to the taxonomy of the Gastropoda by Bouchet & Rocroi, 2005).

This family has no subfamilies.

Genera 
Genera within the family Laubellidae include:
 Laubella Kittl, 1891 - the type genus of the family

References